The Série 9630 are a class of diesel multiple unit trains built for the metre gauge lines of Portuguese Railways (CP) in the Porto area. The trains were built in Portugal by Sorefame and entered service in 1991.

These trains were specifically built for and initially used on local train services from Trindade station in Porto. Built with diesel-electric transmission, they were designed for easy conversion to electric multiple units. Instead of electrifying the Porto-area  lines, it was decided to extensively modernise the system and rebuilt the network completely as part of the Porto Metro (which has been built to ). The closure of these metre gauge lines in 2002 for modernisation left the Série 9630 (and the older Série 9600) units redundant.

Seven two-carriage units of Série 9630 were transferred to the Vouga line, where (as of March 2012) they remain in service. Since 2009 the Vouga line has been CP's only remaining metre gauge line. This line is, however, also threatened with closure; such a closure would render the Série 9630 units redundant for a second time.

See also
Narrow gauge railways in Portugal

External links
Photographs on the railfaneurope website
 Page about CP 9630 on Trainlogistic

References

Narrow gauge railways in Portugal
Diesel multiple units of Portugal